× Burrageara, abbreviated Burr. in the horticultural trade, is the nothogenus for intergeneric hybrids between the orchid genera Cochlioda, Miltonia, Odontoglossum and Oncidium (Cda. × Milt. × Odm. × Onc.). It was grown for the first time by the American Albert Burrage in 1927, and named after him.

In recent years the botanical classification of many orchid genera have been changed. In Genera Orchidacearum (AM Pridgeon, PJ Cribb, FN Rasmussen, MW Chase) the genera Cochlioda and Odontoglossum have mostly been merged to Oncidium. Five species of the original Miltonia now belong to Miltoniopsis. The result is that most of the x Burrageara hybrids should be called x Oncidopsis (Miltoniopsis x Oncidium) or x Miltonidium (Miltonia x Oncidium).

References

Orchid nothogenera
Oncidiinae
1927 in science
Historically recognized angiosperm taxa